Medstar Television Inc. is a television production company based in Allentown, Pennsylvania.

History and founding
Medstar was incorporated in the state of Pennsylvania in 1981 by Paul Dowling and William Ferretti to produce medical news and health information. From the start, Medstar financed, produced and distributed all of its own productions. (Health Matters: Independents Prescription Works)

Productions
One of its first was Health Matters, a program on health and lifestyle issues, produced in cooperation with hospitals throughout the United States, which sponsor the program in their local areas with local and national content, along the same lines as PM Magazine. Health Matters was syndicated to various commercial and PBS stations during the 1980s.

Medstar later expanded to produce two medical news products, "MedstarSource" and "MedstarAdvances" syndicated to commercial television stations in the United States.  Production of these segments ended in August 2011.

In 1990, Medstar began to produce programming for cable television including the Discovery Channel, HBO and TLC.

In 1995, the company created the Medical Detectives series on forensic science, which premiered on TLC in April 1995.  It was the first reality-based forensic series on television and used a 'murder mystery' approach to documentary storytelling. In 2000 the Medical Detectives series moved to the CourtTV network (now TruTV) where it was re-titled Forensic Files and quickly became the networks highest rated television series.  Internationally, the series was sold to stations and networks in over 142 countries where it remains enormously popular.  Peter Thomas narrated the series, with more than 400 episodes. In 2002, Forensic Files would appear on NBC as the first prime time television series originally produced for cable to air on a commercial network, as a summer replacement series.

References

External links 
 Official site
 Paul Dowling on Twitter

Companies based in Allentown, Pennsylvania
Television production companies of the United States
American companies established in 1980
Health information television series
Academic works about medicine
1980 establishments in Pennsylvania